The 2007 Zandvoort Masters of Formula 3 @ Zolder was the seventeenth Masters of Formula 3 race held at Zolder on 5 August 2007. It was won by Nico Hülkenberg, for ASM Formule 3.

Drivers and teams

Classification

Qualifying 1
Group A drivers are highlighted in green.

Even numbers

Odd numbers

Qualifying 2

Group A

Group B

Starting grid

Race

See also
 2007 Formula 3 Euro Series season
 2007 British Formula 3 season

References

External links
 RaceResults.nu

Masters of Formula Three
Masters
Masters of Formula 3
Masters of Formula Three